Guido Giambartolomei (1921–2013) was an Italian film producer. He was also involved with the running of Rome-based football club S.S. Lazio at one point.

Selected filmography
 The Lovers of Manon Lescaut (1954)
 The Bigamist (1956)
 Doctor and the Healer (1957)
 Fathers and Sons (1957)
 Everyone's in Love (1959)
 The Traffic Policeman (1960)
 The Mongols (1961)
 All the Gold in the World (1961)

References

Bibliography
 Ann C. Paietta. Saints, Clergy and Other Religious Figures on Film and Television, 1895–2003. McFarland, 2005.

External links

1921 births
2013 deaths
Film people from Rome
Italian film producers